Taufers im Münstertal is a comune (municipality) in South Tyrol in northern Italy, located about  west of the city of Bolzano, on the border with Switzerland.

Geography

Taufers borders the following municipalities: Glurns, Mals, Prad am Stilfser Joch, Stilfs, Lü (Switzerland), Müstair (Switzerland), Santa Maria Val Müstair (Switzerland), Scuol (Switzerland), and Valchava (Switzerland).

Frazioni
The municipality of Taufers contains the frazioni (subdivisions, mainly villages and hamlets) Pundweil (Pontevilla) and Rifair (Rivaira).

History

Coat-of-arms
The shield is party per bend, the first part of gules and the second fusilly of argent and azure. It is the insignia of Lords of Reichenberg who lived in the local castle since 1373. The emblem was granted in 1967.

Society

Linguistic distribution
According to the 2011 census, 97.85% of the population speak German and 2.15% Italian as first language.

Demographic evolution

References

External links
 Homepage of the municipality

Municipalities of South Tyrol